Statistics of Czechoslovak First League in the 1945–46 season.

Overview
It was contested by 20 teams, and Sparta Prague won the championship. Josef Bican was the league's top scorer with 31 goals.

Stadia and locations

Group A

Table

Results

Group B

Table

Results

Championship playoff
Sparta Prague 4–2 Slavia Prague
Slavia Prague 0–5 Sparta Prague

Top goalscorers

References

Czechoslovakia - List of final tables (RSSSF)

Czechoslovak First League seasons
Czechoslovak First League, 1945-46
1945–46 in Czechoslovak football